Ohio elected its member October 9, 1810.  This was the last election in which Ohio had a single .  Due to rapid population growth in the state, the at-large district had become disproportionately populous by this point.

See also 
 United States House of Representatives elections, 1810 and 1811
 List of United States representatives from Ohio

1810
Ohio
United States House of Representatives